Tabitha is an English feminine given name, originating with (or made popular through) Saint Tabitha, mentioned in the New Testament.

In the Bible
Tabitha or Dorcas is a woman mentioned in the New Testament. The English name is derived from an Aramaic word, /ܛܒܝܬܐ ṭaḇīṯā "[female] gazelle", cf. Tzviya (classical ṣəḇīyāh).

Variants
Other spellings include Tabytha, Tabatha, Tabata, Tabathina and Tabea.

Use in the United States and the United Kingdom
The name was common in 18th century New England, and of those born between 1718 and 1745, ranked about 31st as most common female given names, about 0.56% of the population. The name gained a resurgence in the United States in the 1970s and 1980s, when it was ranked among the 200 most popular names for girls. The character Tabitha Stephens, a child witch on the 1960s television situation comedy Bewitched, raised the profile of the name.
It was ranked among the 1,000 most popular names for girls born in the United States until 2016 and has since declined in usage. There were 162 American girls born in 2021 who were given the name.

The name has ranked among the 300 most popular name for girls in England and Wales between 1996 and 2020.

People

Tabitha
 Dorcas (Greek version of the name), or Tabitha (Aramaic version of the name), Christian woman raised from the dead by Saint Peter
 Tab (not the given name (short for tabitha) (AKA influential yet unfortunate ) yet also sometimes used as an adjective describing the nouns clumsy, bad-juju-magnet, unfortunately unfamiliar with fortune, yet carries it fabulously, trooper survivor strong, these are all adjectives that derive from the nouns that explain what a tap is, and or may be)  and inventor, inventor of the circular saw, not true. But this is fun. 
 Tabitha Brown (1780–1858), American pioneer in the Oregon Territory
 Tabitha Fringe Chase (born 1977), American activist
 Tabitha Chawinga (born 1996), Malawian footballer
 Tabitha D'umo (born 1973), American choreographer, dance teacher and creative director
 Tabitha Ann Holton (c. 1854–1886), first woman licensed as a lawyer in North Carolina
 Tabitha Karanja (born 1964), Kenyan businesswoman, entrepreneur and industrialist
 Tabitha King (born 1949), American author and wife of Stephen King
 Tabitha Love (born 1991), Canadian volleyball player
 Tabitha Lupien (born c. 1988), Canadian actress and competitive dancer
 Tabitha Nauser (born 1992), Singaporean singer
 Tabitha Peterson (born 1989), American curler
 Tabitha Sybil Quaye, Ghanaian politician and Member of Parliament (1992-1997)
 Tabitha Soren (born 1967), reporter for MTV News
 Tabitha St. Germain (born 1976), Canadian stage and voice actress
 Tabitha Suzuma (born 1975), British writer
 Tabitha Gilman Tenney (1762–1837), American author and novelist
 Tabitha Tsatsa (born 1972), Zimbabwean marathon runner
 Tabitha Wady (born 1976), British actress
 Tabitha Yim (born 1985), American gymnast and coach

Tabatha
 Tabatha Coffey (born 1967), Australian hairstylist, salon owner and television personality

Fictional characters

Comics
 Tabitha Smith, a Marvel superhero character

Literature
 Tabitha Twitchit, an anthropomorphic cat who features in the books of Beatrix Potter
 Tabitha "Tibby" Rollins, the main character in The Sisterhood of the Traveling Pants

Movies and television
 Tabitha Galavan, on the American TV series Gotham
 Tabitha Holswatz, more commonly known as "Tabby", a character on Monster Warriors
 Tabitha Lenox, on the NBC daytime drama Passions
 Tabitha Stephens, a child witch from the 1960s American sitcom Bewitched and its 1970s spinoff Tabitha
 Tabitha Wilson, on the American teen drama series 90210
 Tabitha, in the light novel and anime The Familiar of Zero
 Tabitha, in Scary Movie 3
 Tabitha, a fairy queen in Thumbelina (1994 film)
 Tabitha, a girl who owns Roddy the rat in Flushed Away
 Tabitha, the name of an evil fairy god mother who allies with the main villain of season four from DC's Legends of Tomorrow

Video games
 Tabitha, in the 2010 video game Fallout New Vegas
 Tabitha, in the DS game Advance Wars: Days of Ruin
 Team Magma Admin. Tabitha, Team Magma second in command from the Pokémon game franchise, a rare example of Tabitha being used as a masculine name

See also
 Tabby (disambiguation)

References

Given names
Feminine given names
English feminine given names
English-language feminine given names